Allium perdulce, the Plains onion, is a plant species native to the central part of the United States and cultivated as an ornamental elsewhere. It has been found in Texas, New Mexico, Oklahoma, Kansas, Nebraska, South Dakota, and one county in western Iowa (Woodbury County).

Allium perdulceproduces 2-20 bulbs, each up to 3 cm (1.2 inches) in diameter. Flowers are urn-shaped, up to 10 mm (0.4 inches) across; tepals deep rose to purple (except in var. sperryi; see below); pollen yellow.

Two varieties are recognized:

Allium perdulce var. perdulce
Allium perdulce var. sperryi Ownbey

Var. sperryi is a color variant known only from western Texas in the trans-Pecos region. It has white to pale pink flowers instead of the more widespread deep rose to purple.

References

perdulce
Plants described in 1940
Flora of the United States